The Sacramento County Sheriff's Office (SSO), is a local law enforcement agency that serves Sacramento County, California. It provides general-service law enforcement to unincorporated areas of Sacramento County, as well as incorporated cities within the county that have contracted with the agency for law-enforcement services. Currently only Rancho Cordova, and Isleton  has such a contract with the department since the Citrus Heights and Elk Grove Police Departments assumed all police authority and responsibility for their communities in 2006. It also holds primary jurisdiction over facilities operated by Sacramento County, such as local parks, marinas, and government buildings; provides marshal service for the Sacramento County Superior Court; operates the Sacramento County Jail and the Rio Cosumnes Correctional Center in Elk Grove; and provides services such as laboratories and academy training to smaller law-enforcement agencies within the county. The county sheriff is currently Jim Cooper.

Weapons
The Sacramento Sheriff's Office currently issues versions of the 9mm Glock. Deputies also have less lethal items that are issued to them including but not limited to an X26 taser, expandable baton, and OC spray.

Organization
Sheriff Jim Cooper

Office of the Sheriff
Community Relations Unit
Legislative Affairs
Media and Public Affairs
Sheriff's Outreach Community Advisory Board
Special Investigations/Intelligence Bureau
Bingo Licensing
ATF Task Force
Anti-Terrorism
Business License/Labor Relations
Criminal Intelligence/Organized Crime
F.B.I. Joint Terrorism Task Force
Gambling/Vice Operations
Gun Permits
Pawn/Secondhand Dealers

Office of the Undersheriff 
Fleet Services

Contract and Regional Services
Airport Division
Civil Bureau
Court Security Division
B.T. Collins Juvenile Courthouse
Carol Miller Justice Center
Gordon D. Schaber Facility
William R. Ridgeway Family Relations Court
Folsom Dam Bureau
Security Services
Children's Services
DA
DHA
DHHS
Regional Transit Police Services
Threat Management
Traffic Bureau
Parking Enforcement
Red Light Enforcement
Towing Enforcement
Correctional Services
Correctional Food Services
Correctional Health
Main Jail
Rio Cosumnes Correctional Center
Jail Industries
Work Release Division
Alternative Sentencing Program
Child Support Revenue Recovery
Home Detention
Revenue Recovery Warrant Unit
Sheriff's Work Project
Toy Project
Field and Investigative Services
Air Operations
Bicycle Rapid Response
Critical Incident Negotiation Team (CINT)
Emergency Operations
Explosive Ordnance Detail (Bomb Squad)
Off-Duty Employment
Patrol Training
Regional Terrorism Threat Assessment Center (R.T.T.A.C)
Search and Rescue
Special Enforcement Detail
Volunteer Services
Drowning Accident Rescue Team (DART)
Explorers Program
Reserve Forces
Volunteers in Partnership with the Sheriff (V.I.P.S)

Central Division
Canine
Florin Service Center
Marine Enforcement
Rancho Murieta Safety Center
Walnut Grove Service Center

Centralized Investigations Division
ACE (Auto Crimes Enforcement)
Child Abuse
Cold Case Investigations
Crimes Against Persons
Electronic Tracking System
Felony Assault
Homicide Bureau
Major Crimes
Missing Persons
Property Crimes
Robbery
S.A.F.E
Sheriff's Amateur Radio Program (SHARP)
Sexual Assault/Elder Abuse

Hi-Tech Crimes Bureau
Hi-Tech Crimes Task Force
Identity Theft
Internet Crimes Against Children

Impact Bureau
California Multi-agency Methamphetamine Enforcement Team (CAL-MMET)
Gang Suppression
High Impact Drug Trafficking Area Grant (HIDTA)
Intelligence
Specialized Equipment Operations
Youth Services

North Division
Dewey Service Center
Rio Linda Service Center

Rancho Cordova Police Department
East Division

Support Services
Fiscal
Alarm
Homeland Security
Mobile Field Force
Mutual Aid Coordinator
State Office of Homeland Security

Human Resources
Field Support Division
Forensics & Evidence Bureau
Live Scan
Forensics (formerly Identification)
Property
Court Liaison

Communication & Records Bureau
Records and Warrants
Communications
Radio Shop

Information Intelligence Bureau
Intelligence Operations
Technical Operations
Security Operations
Asset Management

Professional Standards Division
Emergency Vehicle Operations Course (EVOC)
Employee Relations
Fair Employment
Training and Education Division
Academy
Emergency Vehicle Operations Course (EVOC)
Firearms Training Unit
Kenneth Royal Firearms Range
In-Service Training
Internal Affairs
Legal Affairs
Pre-Employment
Recruiting

History
The first elected sheriff of Sacramento County was Joseph McKinney. In 1850, McKinney and his deputies were involved in a series of confrontations with Gold Rush-era squatters around the city of Sacramento. McKinney was killed in one such confrontation in August 1850.

Sheriff Don Cox approved the formation of a Sheriff's Air Squadron in the late 1930s or early 1940s, prior to the attack on Pearl Harbor. The Squadron was inactive during World War II as a result of restrictions on civil aviation near the California coast. After the war ended, it became active again and began to undertake support activities for the Sheriff's Department, including prisoner transfers and search and rescue activities.

The Sheriff's Department underwent significant changes in the 1970s.  In the 1970 Sheriff's election, the Deputy Sheriff's Association voiced support for challenger Duane Lowe against incumbent John Misterly, following disagreements regarding deputies' training and pay. Lowe was elected in a run-off election, and during the next six years oversaw efforts to modernize the Sheriff's Department, extend new services to the community, and improve pay and working conditions for deputies.

The Sheriff's Department's canine detail was created in 1979.

In 1998, Theodore Kaczynski was held by the Sacramento Sheriff's Department on suicide watch during pre-trial interviews to determine his competency to stand trial and act as his own lawyer during criminal proceedings.

In 2001, multiple-murderer Nikolay Soltys, one of the FBI's Ten Most Wanted, was captured by the Sacramento Sheriff's Department following one of the largest manhunts in Sacramento history.

1991 Sacramento hostage crisis

The 1991 Sacramento Hostage Crisis occurred on April 4, 1991, when four people took hostages at a Good Guys! Electronics store located at the Florin Mall. The Sacramento County Sheriff's Department Special Enforcement Detail (SED) and Critical Incident Negations Team (CINT) handled the incident.

The local media broadcast the crisis during which hostage takers lined up some of the hostages in front of the entrance as human shields. After which a twenty-year-old male hostage  was shot in the leg released to deliver the gang's message and plight to the local media. They claimed they were trying to draw attention to the troubles of their home country and that they were on a suicide mission. During the rescue attempt three hostages as well as three of the four hostage-takers were killed and fourteen hostages were injured. The situation was the largest hostage rescue operation in U.S. history, with over 50 hostages being held at gunpoint.

Fallen officers

Since the establishment of the Sacramento County Sheriff's Office, 22 officers have died in the line of duty.

Proven misconduct
Multiple credible allegations of brutality, abuse, mismanagement, and cover-ups by deputies and leadership have been levelled against the department under the supervision of multiple department heads, including current Sheriff Jim Cooper, previous Sheriff Scott Jones, and many at the Sacramento County Jail while under the supervision of then Undersheriff John McGinness and then Officer Jim Cooper in his previous position with the department. The Sacramento Bee has documented many such cases in its Watchdog Reports.

Sherrano Stingley

On December 6, 2022, Sherrano Stingley, a beloved father and grandfather, was severely  tased by Sacramento County Sheriff's deputies and held down with a on his daughter's block, officially dying 10 days later in the ICU, haveing never recovered consciousness. The details of his behavior and condition at the scene are in dispute, with deputies saying he was violently resisting arrest and refusing to comply with orders, and the family saying he was experiencing a mental health episode and was unnecessarily brutalized. 

Sheriff Cooper released only one highly edited bodycam of two videos stitched together out of sequnce, and a statement that paints the victim as a career criminal, without acknowledging his mental health or community support. Sheriff Cooper has defiantly refused to release any more video, in violation of CA Assembly Bill 748, a state law that requires body camera footage from critical incidents involving law enforcement to be made available for public inspection within 45 days.

Stingley's family has filed a wrongful death suit. The case is pending.

Maurice Holley

On October 6, 2019, Maurice Holley was shot by a Sacramento County Sheriff's deputy 9 times while on the ground. He was found asleep in a ditch by officers who were called by neighbors reporting a man with a gun was on their property. They apparently knew the victim, saying he had been reported for carrying weapons before. The officer claimed Holley reached for a handgun in his waistband and fired, fearing for his life. It turned out to be an airsoft gun a recreational toy that shoots plastic pellets with non-lethal force. 

His widow sued the department for wrongful death, her lawyer citing the excessive number of shots fired. The Sacramento DA's office cleared the deputies of any misconduct.

Marshall Miles

On October 27, 2019 Marshall Miles was found unresponsive on the floor minutes after he was hogtied while he was being booked and then left facedown, with his wrists still tied to his ankles behind him, on the floor of a  Sacramento County Jail cell.

Sacramento Sheriff Scott Jones refused to release video from the jail for months, finally doing so after ongoing public pressure. It showed that Miles had struggled with the officers who subdued him, shouting "I can't breathe". He died on November 1.

The coroner listed his official cause of death as “complications of cardiopulmonary arrest during restraint and mixed drug intoxication,” noting the presence of narcotics in his system and blunt force injuries to his body.

Miles was arrested for erratic behavior, including jumping on cars, and resisting arrest.

Mykel McIntyre

On May 8th, 2017, Sacramento County Sheriff's deputies shot at McIntyre 28 times, hitting him with 7 bullets, after he threw rocks at an officer and a police dog. Three hours earlier, they had responded to his mother's call for help with a mental health check for her son. McIntyre suffered from mental illness, and was in crisis at the time of his killing.

The Inspector Generals report found the killing to be legal because 8 armed officers and the canine were in credible danger from the otherwise unarmed man. 

Ellis' family claimed they shot him while he was running away. Sheriff Scott Jones refused to release body or camera footage to the family or the public, and had a notoriously hostile relationship with the Inspector General.

Ryan Ellis

On May 5, 2017 Ryan Ellis died in the hospital under deputy's custody due to injuries suffered while being arrested for a parole violation the day before. While detained in a police vehicle, Ellis kicked out a back window of the moving vehicle. The deputy driving the vehicle did not stop the car for over half a mile, when Ellis went through the open window.

The Inspector General reported that the deputies had not fastened Ellis' seatbelt nor turned on the in- car camera - two violations of department policy for which they received written reprimands - but determined that Ellis had jumped out of the window as opposed to being thrown from the vehicle, partially because methamphetamine was present in his system.

Adriene Ludd

On October 11, 2015, Adriene Ludd was shot 13 times, including while lying on the ground, by Sacramento County deputies after fleeing in his vehicle during a traffic stop for expired registration tags on his car. Deputies claimed Ludd had a weapon that he pointed at the deputies, instigating a shootout. They recovered an Intratec Tec-22 semi-automatic pistol with a clear plastic high-capacity magazine at the scene. Ludd's family disputed that he owned any guns, however, the county Inspector General cleared three deputies of misconduct charges, citing that the dash cam footage showed Ludd aiming the gun at the deputies therefore they were in legitimate fear for their lives. 

Black Lives Matter staged a peaceful protest after Sheriff Scott Jones declined to release dashcam and body-camera footage or the coroner’s report, citing the ongoing investigation.

Branden Johnson

On October 29, 2005, Branden Johnson was arrested on suspicion of drunk driving and taken to Sacramento County Jail. He told the Sacramento Bee that during his incarceration, "deputies beat him when he was shackled hand and foot, repeatedly slamming him to the ground." The department denied the allegations and provided an 11-minute video clip from Johnson's 14-hour incarceration, showing Johnson allegedly banging his head against the wall. Johnson stated that he'd like to see the whole video but Undersheriff John McGinness, in charge of operations at the jail, declined to immediately provide the rest of the footage.

Don Anthony Antoine

On June 19, 2004, Don Antoine was arrested by Sacramento Police officers on charges of assaulting a firefighter, driving under the influence of alcohol, and possession of nunchucks after he ran his car off the Arden-Garden Connector in the Gardenland neighborhood of Sacramento and started a fight with firefighters who responded to the accident. He accused deputies of using excessive force when he says they kicked, punched, beat, and choked him while shackling him to the floor grate in a Sacramento County Jail cell, an event that the deputies deny even took place. On April 16, 2008, a federal grand jury awarded Antoine $170,000 after they found the deputies acted maliciously when they beat him, and one of the jurors was quoted saying the deputies "chained him to a grate like a dog."

Jafar Afshar

On June 7, 2003, ex-Marine Jafar Afshar was arrested for public intoxication, charges that were dropped the next morning. During booking, his handcuffs were taken off and he was immediately thrown to the ground, splitting his head open and leaving a pool of blood on the floor. A year later, Afshar filed a federal lawsuit (Afshar v. The only officer named in the lawsuit, Officer Spaid, said in his incident report that Afshar "swung toward him." Afshar received two sets of videotape, the first showing no incident and the second with missing video, which Afshar's attorney called a cover-up.

Mihaita Constantin

Mihaita Constantin, a 33-year-old Romanian immigrant, was arrested on July 14, 2003, on suspicion of drunk driving. While in one of the holding cells, he refused to sit. Five deputies rushed in, handcuffed Constantin, and scuffled with him for well over 5 minutes, putting a towel over his head. Constantin was left semi-conscious, towel still over his head, with a broken hand, fractured nose, and severe bruises; no officers were injured. On June 29, 2004, Constantin filed a federal lawsuit against the department alleging violations of his civil rights; he was later found dead in a crashed car on a mountain slope near Blue Canyon. His wife has returned to Europe but is continuing the lawsuit.

Darryl O'Brien

In 2002, 52-year-old Darryl O'Brien, a woman with no previous criminal record, was "dropped," fracturing her knee. After her handcuffs were removed, her arm was yanked so hard behind her back that her shoulder was fractured. Her claim against the county was later settled for $7,500.

Michael Hay

On December 22, 2000, Sacramento State student Michael Hay was drunk in his apartment when Sheriff's Deputy Rebecca Eubanks came to his apartment about loud music. Hay stated he would keep it down and told Eubanks "You know, you're kind of cute." Eubanks left the apartment. Within a few minutes, Sheriff's Deputy Robert Book arrived at the apartment door. Book said Hay was belligerent toward him and interfered with him finding out what was going on, so Book "handcuffed him and walked him downstairs." Book and Eubanks arrested him for being drunk in public; the charges were later dropped and Book was reprimanded because his "arrest of Michael Hay was without legal authority." While Hay was being booked at the Sacramento County Jail, staff made repeated comments about what his stay was going to be like. Eubanks said, "We're really, really bored and we need somebody to play with, so you're it, OK?" Later the staff nurse warned him that "they like to hurt people around here" and an unidentified officer made a shadow-boxing motion. When Hay was searched, Deputy Santos Ramos and another deputy twisted both arms with such force that Hay's right arm broke. After spending the night with a broken arm and no medical attention, he was released and sought medical care three days later. In 2002, Hay settled a lawsuit against the department for $147,500. Deputies at the jail were counseled for failing to report the injury, but not the injury itself.

Troy Zwierzynski

In 1999, Troy Zwierzynski had surrendered himself at the jail to complete a work project as part of a misdemeanor sentence. While in a holding cell, he said, he heard a man screaming and turned to look. A deputy ordered Zwierzynski to look away, and "slammed him against the wall violently twisting back his wrists and arms," the complaint states. "The deputies asked (him) if he was going to look the next time. ... Plaintiff, in tears, responded that he would not look again." His wrist was broken, and he later received a settlement of $35,000.

Judson King

In 1998, a deputy at the jail ordered Judson King to move faster, to which he replied, "I am." King claimed that his elbow was immediately fractured, and later received a settlement of $35,000.

See also

 List of law enforcement agencies in California
 1991 Sacramento hostage crisis

References

External links
 Official website

Sheriff's Office
Sheriffs' departments of California
1850 establishments in California